Rosenheim is a Landkreis (district) in the south of Bavaria, Germany.
The district entirely surrounds the city of Rosenheim, which is independently administered but hosts the district's administration; both the city and the district share the "RO" designation for their license plates.

History
The district was created in 1972 when the former districts Rosenheim, Bad Aibling, and parts of Wasserburg am Inn were merged.

Geography
The Rosenheim district is located in the foothills of the Alps, the Chiemgau. The landscape is dominated by moraines created by the Inn Glacier in the last glacial period, including many lakes. To the east of the district is the largest of these lakes, the Chiemsee. The main rivers in the district are the Inn and the Mangfall, which meet in the city of Rosenheim.

Mountain ranges in the south of the district include the Chiemgauer Alpen and the Mangfallgebirge, which also contains the Wendelstein, at  the highest elevation in the district.

Coat of arms
The coat of arms includes the distinctive Bavarian fusily at the top. The crossed leaves of the water lilly on the left are taken from the Frauenchiemsee coat of arms, symbolizing the Chiemsee area of the district, and the red lion represents the city of Wasserburg. The coat of arms was granted in 1976.

Towns and municipalities

References

External links

 Official website (in German)

 
Districts of Bavaria